Paulo Jorge Martins dos Santos Pina (born 4 January 1981 in Setúbal, Portugal) is a Cape Verdean professional footballer who played for Cypriot club Ermis Aradippou FC as a central defender.

Club statistics

References

External links

Official website

1981 births
Living people
Sportspeople from Setúbal
Portuguese people of Cape Verdean descent
Citizens of Cape Verde through descent
Cape Verdean footballers
Portuguese footballers
Association football defenders
Liga Portugal 2 players
Segunda Divisão players
Vitória F.C. players
S.C.U. Torreense players
A.D. Lousada players
G.D. Estoril Praia players
C.D. Fátima players
Al-Arabi SC (Kuwait) players
Cypriot First Division players
Olympiakos Nicosia players
Ermis Aradippou FC players
Cape Verde international footballers
Cape Verdean expatriate footballers
Portuguese expatriate footballers
Expatriate footballers in Kuwait
Expatriate footballers in Cyprus
Portuguese expatriate sportspeople in Cyprus
Kuwait Premier League players
Cape Verdean expatriate sportspeople in Kuwait
Cape Verdean expatriate sportspeople in Cyprus
Portuguese expatriate sportspeople in Kuwait